Hristo Borisov Hall is an arena in Varna, Bulgaria. The arena holds 800 people, and it is primarily used for basketball and volleyball. The arena is home to  basketball team Euroins Cherno More.

Sports venues in Varna, Bulgaria